Robert Groom (September 12, 1884 – February 19, 1948), was a professional baseball player who played as a pitcher in two midwest minor leagues and the Pacific Coast League from 1904 to 1908, and then in the Major Leagues from 1909 to 1918. He pitched for the Washington Senators (1909–1913), St. Louis Terriers (Federal League, 1914–1915), St. Louis Browns (1916–1917), and Cleveland Indians (1918).

Biography

Groom's best major league season was with the 1912 Senators, when he won 24 games and Washington finished second in the American League. During his debut season, Groom became the first pitcher to achieve 19 consecutive losses in a season, a record which was equalled in 1916 by Jack Nabors.

In September 1916, Groom was also involved in a confrontation with George Sisler, the Browns' normally mild-mannered first baseman. After an inning in which Sisler missed a high throw to first base, Groom yelled, "Listen, you...college boy, you run harder for those...balls. Where the hell do you think you are, at a...tea party?" Pale-faced, Sisler stared momentarily at Groom, then strolled over and punched the pitcher in the mouth with his left fist. Groom never yelled at his teammate again.

On May 6, 1917, while with the Browns, Groom no-hit the eventual World Champion Chicago White Sox 3–0. The no-hitter came in the second game of Sunday double-header, after Groom preserved the win in the first game, pitching the last two innings without allowing a hit. It also came the day after teammate Ernie Koob's 1–0 no-hitter against the White Sox; to date, Koob and Groom are the only teammates to pitch no-hitters on consecutive days.

After the 1918 season, Bob Groom returned to Belleville, where he managed his family's coal mining operation and, in the summers, pitched for and managed local teams into the 1920s, most notably Belleville's White Rose team. Throughout the 1920s and 1930s he was involved with the St. Louis Trolley League as a mentor, and in 1938, he was asked by the George E. Hilgard American Legion Post 58 to form Belleville's first tournament team. He did and coached them to the state and regional championships in their first season. He led the "Hilgards" through 1944, and for his role in founding the team was inducted into the Hilgard Hall of Fame in February 2008. A marker in his honor, part of a series that grew out of the Society for American Baseball Research (SABR) Deadball Stars books, was presented on June 5, 2008, at the Belleville Hilgards' home ballpark, Whitey Herzog Field.

See also

 List of Major League Baseball no-hitters
 List of people with surname Groom

References

External links

 Deadball Stars biography at SABR BioProject 
 Photo of Bob Groom, about 1910, in Washington, D.C. travel uniform
 

1884 births
1948 deaths
Major League Baseball pitchers
Baseball players from Illinois
Washington Senators (1901–1960) players
St. Louis Terriers players
St. Louis Browns players
Cleveland Indians players
Sportspeople from Belleville, Illinois
Portland Beavers players
Fort Scott Giants players
Springfield Highlanders players
Springfield Midgets players